Something Like Summer is a 2011 novel by Jay Bell, and the first installment in the Something Like... series. It was adapted into a film of the same name in 2017. The novel centers around the life of Benjamin Bentley, a 17-year-old from Houston, Texas, and his tumultuous relationship with two love interests over the span of several years.

It deals primarily with themes of personal fulfillment, self-acceptance and the process of coming out.

Plot

Plot summary
The novel is written from a third person limited point of view, told through the eyes of the book's main character, Benjamin Bentley. It is divided into three separate sections based on the varying stages of Benjamin's life as the story is taking place.

The first part of the book, set in the city of Houston in 1996, focuses on the relationship Ben eventually develops with Tim Wyman, another teenager who he attends high school with. Though Ben gradually manages to help Tim accept different aspects of his repressed homosexuality, and even talks him into breaking up with the girlfriend he dated in order to maintain his appearance, they eventually break up after a close call with the police who nearly catch them having sex in a public park. The two teenagers carry on with their lives and eventually go their separate ways.

The second part of the novel is set three years later in 1999, when Ben is a freshman student in college and has relocated to Chicago. He meets flight attendant Jace Holden while flying back home for the holidays, and the two eventually fall in love and decide to move in together. After Ben transfers to a new school in Austin, he discovers that Tim is also a student there. Tim, now having embraced his sexuality, makes repeated attempts to meddle in Ben's new relationship, eventually convincing Ben that Jace is cheating on him so that they can get back together. Ben eventually learns the truth, and decides to leave Tim and get back together with Jace.

The third and final segment of the novel takes place in 2003. After having graduated, Ben begins working part-time as a speech therapist and actor at a dinner theater. Ben and Jace later decide to get married and buy a house together. Tim eventually pays Ben a visit after one of his performances at the theater and beckons Ben to help him leave his dysfunctional relationship with Ryan, a younger college student who abuses alcohol and drugs. After helping Tim, Ben attempts to establish a platonic relationship with him whilst living with Jace. He soon realizes he can't and decides to cut him out of his life, seemingly for good.

Jace's health begins to deteriorate some years later after suffering from a brain hemorrhage, and he eventually succumbs to a brain aneurysm. In light of Jace's passing, Ben suffers depression and contemplates suicide. His friend Allison turns to Tim for help, and sets up a reunion between the two. The two meet each other once again, and after realizing that Tim has turned his life around and overcome all his previous hang-ups, Ben agrees to resume the relationship they began over a decade earlier when they were teenagers.

Main characters
Ben Bentley - The novel's main character, a gay teenager who is fully out of the closet to his friends and family. He develops an intimate relationship with Tim Wyman, though it quickly deteriorates due to the latter still being in the closet. He later develops feelings for another character, Jace Holden. Their relationship becomes strained when Tim re-enters Ben's life after having come to terms with his own sexuality. 
Tim Wyman - Ben's primary love interest during the first part of the novel, whose inability to accept his homosexuality serves as the catalyst for their eventual breakup. He makes recurring appearances later throughout.
Jace Holden - A flight attendant who Ben meets on his way home during winter break, who he later ends up moving in with and marrying. 
Allison Cross - Ben's best friend throughout the book, who indirectly serves as the voice of conscience for several characters in the series.

Critical reception
The book was also a finalist in the 24th Lambda Literary Awards under the category of gay romance.

Film adaptation

Something Like Summer was adapted into a film by Blue Seraph Productions in 2017. The screenplay was written by producer Carlos Pedraza, and the film was directed by David Berry. Both men had previously worked in the production of another LGBT film, Judas Kiss, in 2011. Actor Grant Davis played the lead role of Benjamin Bentley, while Davi Santos and Ben Baur played the roles of Tim and Jace, respectively. The movie was released on February 25, 2017.

School edition
A second edition of the novel was published in August 2017. The revised version, marketed as being more school friendly, largely removed the book's descriptions of sexual acts between the main characters. On the film's website, author Jay Bell explained, "I really want to get Something Like Summer into schools and into the hands of young people, but the explicit content has always made that difficult". Additional changes were also made to alter the story's pacing.

See also

Gay teen fiction

References

External links
 Jay Bell Books

2011 American novels
LGBT-related young adult novels
American novels adapted into films
American young adult novels
Gay male teen fiction